Richard C. Cushing may refer to:

Richard Cardinal Cushing (1895–1970), US prelate of the Roman Catholic Church
Richard C. Cushing, Mayor of Omaha, 1890–1892